The  or , is one of the two professional baseball leagues constituting Nippon Professional Baseball in Japan. The winner of the league championship competes against the winner in the Central League for the annual Japan Series. It currently consists of six teams from around Japan.

History 
The circuit was founded as the Taiheiyo Baseball Union (太平洋野球連盟, Taiheiyo Yakyu Renmei) in 1949 (the name changing to its current form in 1980). Daiei Stars owner Masaichi Nagata was the first president of the Pacific League.

The league began with seven teams: four holdovers from the previous iteration, the Japanese Baseball League — the Hankyu Braves, the Nankai Hawks, the Daiei Stars, and the Tokyu Flyers — and three new teams — the Kintetsu Pearls, the Mainichi Orions, and the Nishitetsu Clippers.

In 1954, an eighth Pacific League team was founded, the Takahashi Unions, to increase the number of teams to eight. Although the team was stocked with players from the other Pacific League teams, the Unions struggled from the outset and finished in the second division every season. In 1957, the Unions were merged with the Daiei Stars to form the Daiei Unions (and again bringing the number of Pacific League teams down to seven). In their first season, the Unions finished in last place, 43-1/2 games out of first. In 1958, the Unions merged with the Mainichi Orions to form the Daimai Orions. This enabled the Pacific League to shrink from the ungainly seven-team arrangement to six teams.

Fujio Nakazawa, a former player and television commentator, became the PL's first full-time president in 1959, serving through 1965.

From 1973 to 1982, the Pacific League employed a split season, with the first-half winner playing against the second-half winner in a mini-playoff to determine its champion.

Beginning in 1975, the Pacific League began using the designated hitter (DH), as in the American League in Major League Baseball. During interleague play (adopted in 2005), the DH is used in Pacific League teams' home games.

After the 2004 Nippon Professional Baseball season and, the Orix BlueWave and the Osaka Kintetsu Buffaloes merged to form the Orix Buffaloes. A franchise was granted to internet shopping company Rakuten and the city of Sendai, forming the Tohoku Rakuten Golden Eagles to fill the void caused by the merger.

Also since 2004, a three-team playoff system was introduced in the Pacific League (Pacific League Championship Series). The teams with the second- and third-best records play in the three-game first stage, with the winner advancing to a best-of-six final against the top team (the Pacific League pennant winner is granted a 1 game advantage in the Final Stage). The winner becomes the representative of the Pacific League to the Japan Series.

Since the Pacific League won every Japan Series after introducing this system, an identical system was introduced to the Central League in 2007, and the post-season intra-league games were renamed the "Climax Series" in both leagues. Player statistics and drafting order based on team records are not affected by these postseason games.

Current teams

Pacific League pennant winners

*From 2004 to 2006 the winner of the play-offs was considered Pacific League Champion, afterwards the regular season champion again.

Pacific League statistics

Most Valuable Pitcher
See: Best Nine Award#Other notes

Best Nine Awards

See also
 Nippon Professional Baseball

References

External links 
  Official website
  PACIFIC LEAGUE.JP
 Japanese Baseball Data Archive at The Baseball Guru
 List of players at Japanese Baseball

1
2
1949 establishments in Japan
Sports leagues established in 1949
Annual events in Japan
Professional sports leagues in Japan